Stigmella tricentra is a moth of the family Nepticulidae. It is found in New Zealand.

The length of the forewings is about 2.6 mm. Adults have been recorded emerging through the upper cuticle of the leaf in March and October. Adults reared from larvae collected in May, July and August hatched June, August and September. There are probably two generations per year.

The larvae feed on Helichrysum aggregatum. They mine the leaves of their host plant. The mine is tightly coiled. The contortions are so close together that the mine often forms a secondary blotch. The frass fills the gallery, but the original course is recognisable because the gallery walls remain. Larva have been recorded from April to September. They are 3–4 mm long and pale yellow.

The cocoon is spun from brown silk and is found within the mine. Cocoons have been found in May, August and September.

References

External links
Fauna of New Zealand - Number 16: Nepticulidae (Insecta: Lepidoptera)

Nepticulidae
Moths of New Zealand
Moths described in 1889